Paul Meissner (31 May 1907 – 2 June 1983) was an Austrian architect. His work was part of the architecture event in the art competition at the 1936 Summer Olympics.

References

1907 births
1983 deaths
20th-century Austrian architects
Olympic competitors in art competitions
Architects from Vienna